John Milo "Mike" Ford (April 10, 1957 – September 25, 2006) was an American science fiction and fantasy writer, game designer, and poet.

A contributor to several online discussions, Ford composed poems, often improvised, in both complicated forms and blank verse; he also wrote pastiches and parodies of many other authors and styles. At Minicon and other science fiction conventions he would perform "Ask Dr. Mike", giving humorous answers to scientific and other questions in a lab coat before a whiteboard.

Life
Ford was born in East Chicago, Indiana, and raised in Whiting, Indiana. In the mid-1970s he attended Indiana University Bloomington, where he was active in the IU science fiction club and Society for Creative Anachronism (using the name Miles Atherton de Grey); while there, he published his first short story "This, Too, We Reconcile" in the May 1976 Analog.

Ford left IU and moved to New York to work on the newly founded Isaac Asimov's Science Fiction Magazine, where, starting in mid-1978, he published poetry, fiction, articles, and game reviews. Although his last non-fiction appeared there in September 1981, he was tenth most frequent contributor for the 1977–2002 period. About 1990, he moved to Minneapolis. In addition to writing, he worked at various times as a hospital orderly, computer consultant, slush pile reader, and copy editor.

Ford suffered from complications related to diabetes since childhood and also had renal dysfunction which required dialysis and, in 2000, a kidney transplant, which improved his quality of life considerably. He was found dead from natural causes in his Minneapolis home on September 25, 2006, by his partner since the mid-1990s, Elise Matthesen. He was a prominent member of the Friends of the Minneapolis Public Library, which established a John M. Ford Book Endowment after his death with the donations to be used as interest-generating capital for yearly purchase of new books.

Work
Ford's works were varied in setting and style. Several were of the Bildungsroman (coming-of-age) type: in Web of Angels, The Final Reflection, Princes of the Air, Growing Up Weightless, and The Last Hot Time, Ford wrote variations on the theme of growing up, learning about one's world and one's place in it, and taking responsibility for it – which involves taking on the power and wisdom to influence events, to help make the world a better place.

Ford spent part of his career working in other people's universes. His 1983 book The Klingons for FASA's Star Trek: The Role Playing Game had an influence on subsequent productions from Paramount. He also wrote a comedic novel set in the Star Trek universe called How Much for Just the Planet?, where the Enterprise crew compete with a Klingon crew for control of a planet whose unhappy colonists defend their peace in inventive and farcial ways. The book includes song lyrics that satirize many 20th century stage musicals.

Ford authored the award-winning adventure The Yellow Clearance Black Box Blues (1985) for West End Games' Paranoia role-playing game.

Ford used a variety of styles to suit the world, characters, and situations he chose to write about. Author and critic John Clute wrote in the 1993  Encyclopedia of Science Fiction that "two decades into his career, there remains some sense that JMF remains unwilling or unable to create a definitive style or mode; but his originality is evident, a shifting feisty energy informs almost everything he writes, and that career is still young."

Ford was much respected by his fellow writers, editors, critics and fans. Robert Jordan, Ford's lifelong close friend, called Ford "the best writer in America – bar none." Neil Gaiman called Ford "my best critic... the best writer I knew." Patrick Nielsen Hayden said, "Most normal people had the slight sense that something large and super-intelligent and trans-human had sort of flown over... There would be a point where basically the plot would become so knotted and complex he would lose all of us."

After his death, almost all of Ford's work was out of print. The rights to his work had reverted to his legal heirs, but no one had managed to get in touch with them. After an investigation by a journalist, Isaac Butler, Ford's editors at Tor Books were able to reconnect with his family, and in November 2019 an agreement was reached to reissue all his published works, starting in 2020 with The Dragon Waiting.

Bibliography

Books
 Web of Angels (1980, Pocket Books, ; 1992, Tor Books), an early exploration of some topics that would later be described as cyberpunk
 The Princes of the Air (1982, Pocket Books, ; 1991, Tor Books), a space opera
 The Dragon Waiting (1983, Timescape Books, ; 1985, Avon Books, ; 2002, Gollancz), a fantasy alternate history combining vampires, the Medicis, and the convoluted English politics surrounding Edward IV and Richard III; winner of the 1984 World Fantasy Award
 The Final Reflection (1984, Pocket Books, ; 1985, Ultramarine, ; 1985, Gregg Press, ; 1991, Pocket Books), a Star Trek tie-in novel; (also 2004, Pocket Books,  [in omnibus Signature Edition, The Hand of Kahless])
 How Much for Just the Planet? (1987, Pocket Books, ; 1990, ; 1991), a Star Trek tie-in novel
 The Scholars of Night (1988, Tor Books, ; 1989), a high tech Cold War thriller involving an undiscovered Christopher Marlowe play
 Casting Fortune (1989, Tor Books), a collection of stories set in the Liavek shared world, reprints "A Cup of Worrynot Tea" and "Green Is the Color" and original story "The Illusionist"
 Fugue State (1990, Tor Books), a longer version of the novella of the same name, published as Tor SF Double No. 25 with The Death of Doctor Island by Gene Wolfe
 Growing Up Weightless (1993, Bantam Spectra, ; 1994), a Bildungsroman set on a human-colonized Moon; joint winner of the 1993 Philip K. Dick Award
 Timesteps (1993, Rune Press), a selection of poems
 From the End of the Twentieth Century (1997, NESFA Press), a collection of short stories, poetry, and essays
 The Last Hot Time (2000, Tor Books, ; 2001 paperback), urban fantasy set in a magical Chicago, Illinois
 Heat of Fusion and Other Stories (2004, Tor Books), a collection of short stories and poetry, finalist for the World Fantasy Award in 2005
Aspects (2022, Tor Books), The final novel written by Ford.

With Darrell Schweitzer and George H. Scithers, Ford co-authored On Writing Science Fiction (The Editors Strike Back!) (1981, Owlswick Press, ; Wildside Press 2000), a writers' manual with advice illustrated by short stories that were first sales to IASFM.

Short works and poetry
 "A Cup of Worrynot Tea" in Liavek: The Players of Luck (1986, edited by Emma Bull and Will Shetterly)
 "Green Is the Color", "Eel Island Shoals" (song), "Pot-Boil Blues" (song) in Liavek: Wizard's Row (1987, edited by Emma Bull and Will Shetterly)
 "Winter Solstice, Camelot Station" (in Invitation to Camelot, edited by Parke Godwin)
 "Riding the Hammer" in Liavek: Spells of Binding (1988, edited by Emma Bull and Will Shetterly)
 "The Grand Festival: Sestina" (poem), "Divination Day: Invocation" (poem), "Birth Day: Sonnet" (poem), "Procession Day/Remembrance Night: Processional/Recessional" (poem), "Bazaar Day: Ballad" (poem), "Festival Day: Catechism" (poem), "Restoration Day: Plainsong" in Liavek: Festival Week (1990, edited by Emma Bull and Will Shetterly)
 "Scrabble with God", IASFM October 1985, reprinted in From the End of the Twentieth Century

Other published works
 Ford wrote extensively for the Traveller (role-playing game).
 Ford published some children's fiction under pseudonyms that he did not make public, and two children's gamebooks under house names Michael J. Dodge (Star Trek: Voyage to Adventure, 1984) and Milo Dennison (The Case of the Gentleman Ghost, 1985).
 Ford plotted three issues of the Captain Confederacy alternate history comics in the late 1980s and wrote issue number 10, "Driving North."
 Ford also contributed to The World of Robert Jordan's The Wheel of Time (2001, Tor Books), drawing some of the maps.

Games
 Traveller (role-playing game)
 The Yellow Clearance Black Box Blues (1985, West End Games), an adventure for the Paranoia roleplaying game
 Star Trek III with Greg Costikyan and Doug Kaufman (1985, West End Games)
 GURPS Time Travel with Steve Jackson (1991, Steve Jackson Games), a resource book for the GURPS roleplaying game
 GURPS Y2K with Steve Jackson et al. (1999, Steve Jackson Games), a resource book for the GURPS roleplaying game
 GURPS Traveller: Starports (2000, Steve Jackson Games), a resource book for the GURPS Traveller roleplaying game
 GURPS Infinite Worlds with Steve Jackson and Kenneth Hite (2005, Steve Jackson Games), a resource book for the GURPS roleplaying game
 Scared Stiffs with Bill Slaviscek (1987, West End Games), a module for the Ghostbusters Roleplaying Game.
 Ford further wrote Klingon manuals for the Star Trek role-playing game, and a number of RPG articles, which appeared in Autoduel Quarterly, Pyramid, Roleplayer, Space Gamer, and Journal of the Travellers' Aid Society.
 In The Final Reflection he described a chess-like game played by Klingons, klin zha, which has been adopted by Klingon fandom.

Awards
 2005 Origins Award for Role-Playing Game Supplement of the Year – GURPS Infinite Worlds 4th Edition
 1998 Minnesota Book Award for Fantasy & Science Fiction
 1993 Philip K. Dick Award – Growing Up Weightless
 1991 Origins Award for Best Roleplaying Supplement – GURPS Time Travel
 1989 World Fantasy Award for Best Short Fiction – "Winter Solstice, Camelot Station" (in Invitation to Camelot, edited by Parke Godwin)
 1989 Rhysling Award for Long Poem – also "Winter Solstice, Camelot Station"
 1985 Origins Award for Best Roleplaying Supplement – The Yellow Clearance Black Box Blues
 1984 World Fantasy Award for Best Novel – The Dragon Waiting

Nominations
 2005 World Fantasy Award for Best Collection – Heat of Fusion and Other Stories
 1996 Nebula Award for Best Novelette – "Erase/Record/Play" (in Starlight 1, edited by Patrick Nielsen Hayden)
 1996 Theodore Sturgeon Award – also "Erase/Record/Play"
 1995 Rhysling Award for Long Poems – "Troy: The Movie" (in Weird Tales, Spring 1994)
 1991 Rhysling Award for Long Poems – "Bazaar Day: Ballad" (in Liavek: Festival Week, edited by Will Shetterly and Emma Bull) and "Cosmology: A User’s Manual" (in Isaac Asimov's Science Fiction Magazine, January 1990)
 1990 Rhysling Award for Long Poems – "A Holiday in the Park" (in Weird Tales, Winter 1988/1989)
 1987 Nebula Award for Best Novelette (final ballot) – "Fugue State" (in Under the Wheel, edited by Elizabeth Mitchell)

References

Further reading

Texts by Ford online
 Mike Ford: Occasional Works – Part One to Twelve and Coda: selection of Ford's comments to Patrick and Teresa Nielsen Hayden's weblog Making Light, with links to context
 110 Stories, poem written about the September 11, 2001 attacks
 Troy: The Movie, 1994 poem
 Winter Solstice, Camelot Station, 1989 poem
 "As Above, So Below", short story (in Dragons of Light, ed. Orson Scott Card, Ace Books, 1980)
 "Driving North", short story written as the script for issue 10 of Captain Confederacy
 Strange Horizons 2002 interview with Ford
 Patrick Nielsen Hayden's 2001 online interview with Ford (and other inkWELL participants)
 Alex Krislov's 1980s interview with Ford
 Quote from "Playing Scrabble with God", another
 Ford's USENET posts 1994–5, in Google Groups archive

About Ford
 Teresa Nielsen Hayden: Making Light: John M. Ford, 1957–2006. With links to online works by Ford, articles, weblog posts and memories about Ford
 Will Shetterly: 
 Neil Gaiman: Introduction to From the End of the Twentieth Century
 Steve Jackson: Daily Illuminator article remembering Ford
 John Clute: Obituary: John M. Ford, in The Independent
 Andrew Brown: column on London memorial gathering for Ford, in The Guardian
 David Langford: John M Who? SFX December 2006
 Photos tagged "JohnMFord" at Flickr.com
 More links remembering John M. Ford

External links
 
 John M. Ford, game designer at BoardGameGeek.Com
 John M. Ford: A Chronological Bibliography up to 1997 by New England Science Fiction Association
 Fan memorial website
 Bibliography with cover scans at Fantastic Fiction

1957 births
2006 deaths
20th-century American novelists
20th-century American poets
American fantasy writers
American alternate history writers
American gamebook writers
American male novelists
American male poets
American science fiction writers
Cyberpunk writers
GURPS writers
Indiana University Bloomington alumni
American male short story writers
People from East Chicago, Indiana
People from Whiting, Indiana
Role-playing game designers
Rhysling Award for Best Long Poem winners
World Fantasy Award-winning writers
Novelists from Minnesota
20th-century American short story writers
Kidney transplant recipients
20th-century American male writers